Empicoris vagabundus is a species of thread-legged bug in the family Reduviidae. It inhabits deciduous trees, where it hunts for prey such as barklice.

References

Further reading

 
 
 
 
 
 
 

Reduviidae
Bugs described in 1758
Taxa named by Carl Linnaeus
Hemiptera of North America